Sir Richard Alston CBE (born 30 October 1948) is a British choreographer. He has been resident choreographer and artistic director for the Ballet Rambert and is currently artistic director at The Place. His works include "Windhover" (1972), "Soda Lake", and "Pulsinella" (1987).

Life and career
Educated at Eton College, Alston trained as a dancer at the London School of Contemporary Dance, and then choreographed for the London Contemporary Dance Theatre before forming the UK's first independent dance company, Strider, in 1972.  

In 1976, he went to New York City to study at the Merce Cunningham Dance Studio.  In 1980 he was appointed resident choreographer with Ballet Rambert, serving as the company's artistic director from 1986 to 1992. 

During that time he created 25 works for Rambert as well as the Royal Danish Ballet (1982), the Royal Ballet (1983), and two solo works for Michael Clark (Soda Lake and Dutiful Ducks).  He returned to Rambert in 2001, creating Unrest for the company's 70th anniversary.

In 1981, Alston's dance company, "Strider", had merged with choreographer Siobhan Davies' company "Siobhan Davies and Dancers", to form "Second Stride".

A revival of his Dangerous Liaisons (1985) was toured by Scottish Ballet in 2003. 

In 1994, Alston took up the post of artistic director at The Place and formed The Richard Alston Dance Company; since then he has made over 50 pieces for the company.

In 2011 Alston created a new ballet en pointe, A Rugged Flourish, for New York Theatre Ballet

Honours
Alston was made an honorary Doctor of Philosophy (Dance) at the University of Surrey in 1992 and in 2003 he received an honorary MA from University College Chichester. 

In 1995, he was named Chevalier dans l'Ordre des Arts et des Lettres in recognition of his work in France.  

In January 2001 he was appointed a CBE. Alston was knighted in the 2019 New Year's Honours List for Services to Dance.

Richard Alston Dance Company

Alston's own company was launched in 1994 to critical acclaim.  In 2002 the BBC commissioned Alston to choreograph excerpts from The Rite of Spring for their Masterworks series, directed by Jonathan Haswell.  In Autumn 2003, Martin Lawrance's Grey Allegro was introduced into the repertoire – the first time another choreographer's work has been performed by the company. 

In May 2004 the company made its New York debut with a week of performances at the Joyce Theater. In March 2020 Richard Alston Dance Company ceased activity in line with new priorities for touring, agreed between The Place and Arts Council England.

References

External links

1948 births
Living people
British choreographers
Ballet choreographers
Commanders of the Order of the British Empire
Knights Bachelor
People educated at Eton College